The Office of Program Policy Analysis and Government Accountability (OPPAGA) is the research arm of the Florida Legislature.  OPPAGA supports the Florida Legislature by providing data, evaluative research, and objective analyses that assist legislative budget and policy deliberations.   State law, legislative leadership, and the Joint Legislative Auditing Committee determine OPPAGA's research issues. OPPAGA's research focuses on improving program performance, saving money, and ensuring that program activities are appropriate.   Since 1998, the state has saved $857 million by adopting policy options and recommendations presented in OPPAGA reports.  OPPAGA operates under the guidance of a coordinator appointed by the Joint Legislative Auditing Committee and confirmed by the House and Senate.

History
In 1994, the Florida Legislature removed the program evaluation unit from the Florida Auditor General and created OPPAGA to help improve the performance and accountability of state government. Since this time, OPPAGA has provided over 1,000 reports to the Legislature. During this period, the office has received several awards for improving state government.

National Legislative Program Evaluation Society Excellence in Evaluation Award (2010). The criteria for the award are making a positive impact, producing a notable body of work, and furthering the field of legislative evaluation. OPPAGA also received this prestigious award in 2007, 1997, and 1989. 
National Legislative Program Evaluation Society Recognition of Impact Award (2016). This award distinguishes offices that release reports documenting public policy impact within their respective states. OPPAGA has won an Impact award in most years since it was first awarded in 1998.
National Legislative Program Evaluation Society Methodology Award (2015). This award recognizes projects that exemplify excellent uses of evaluation methodologies. OPPAGA also won the Methodology Award in 2011, 2009, 2007 and 2000.
Center for Accountability and Performance (CAP) Organizational Leadership Award (2001). This award recognizes an organization's outstanding application of a systems approach to performance measurement that has resulted in a culture change, sustained improvements, and demonstrated positive effects on government performance and accountability.

While Governing magazine reported that OPPAGA is "one of the most impressive legislative oversight offices in the country", the office's findings and recommendations may at times be considered controversial.  For example, a 2004 OPPAGA report found that a Medicaid "disease management" program the state launched in 1997 had failed to achieve its goals.  Under this program, drug manufacturers received an exemption from state-mandated prescription drug discounts in exchange for providing disease management services to state Medicaid recipients with chronic conditions. OPPAGA found that the program saved the state $13.4 million, far less than the projected $108.4 million.  The Florida Agency for Health Care Administration, which oversaw the program, and Pfizer, one of the pharmaceutical manufacturers that provided disease management, argued with the review's methodology. However, lawmakers ultimately followed OPPAGA's recommendation to separate the disease management program from the state-mandated drug discount exemptions. Now drug manufacturers can no longer provide disease management services in order to receive an exemption from state-mandated prescription drug discounts.

In 2011 it reported that a $108 million program to add seats to the states schools in anticipation of urgent need from 1998 to 2011, overbuilt by 25%, due to economic stagnation and subsequent lack of growth.

Products
OPPAGA provides a variety of research services. 
Reports evaluate state agencies and programs and analyze specific policy issues.  Reports cover a variety of state agencies and issues, or analyze the impact of a potential program or policy. 
The Government Program Summaries (GPS) is an online encyclopedia of more than 200 major Florida state government programs. It provides a basic program description, highlights recent issues related to the program, includes the latest budget information, and lists contact information and recent reports.
The Florida Monitor Weekly is a free, electronic newsletter that is delivered to over 5,500 recipients per week.  Issued every Friday, the newsletter provides policy makers, government administrators, and other interested parties with links to OPPAGA reports as well as publications by state and federal agencies, think tanks, and the media. 
OPPAGA researches all aspects of state government and conducts work through four policy areas – Criminal  and Juvenile Justice; Education; Government Operations; and Health and Human Services. A staff director heads each policy area.  The following list provides examples of recent work completed by each policy area.
Criminal  and Juvenile Justice: Reviewed the possibility of creating pilot programs to use intermediate sanctions for some non-violent offenders (Report 10-27, March 2010).  The review found that these options may be appropriate for a large number of Florida's criminal justice population, as over 70% of new prison admissions and 40% of current prisoners are non-violent offenders, and the state could save $387,989 to $1.2 million for every 100 prisoners diverted from incarceration.
Education: Studied whether it would be feasible to use state-level data on promising occupations and training programs effectiveness to guide the flow of state workforce funding to postsecondary programs (Report 10-26, March 2010).  The report concluded that targeted programs do not perform substantially better than non-targeted programs. In addition, the state data sources have some limitations for targeting resources that make it currently infeasible to exclusively use it to direct state funding for career education programs.
Government Operations: Examined the enactment of laws to provide protections and remedies for existing and unregulated Internet poker activities in Florida (Report 09-39, November 2009). Found that if the Legislature wishes to provide consumer protections for Internet poker, it could consider three options: (1) maintain the status quo and monitor federal legislation that would establish a federal licensing system; (2) adopt laws that would prohibit Internet poker; or (3) adopt laws to authorize and regulate intrastate Internet poker.  
Health and Human Services: Evaluated efforts to prevent, detect, deter, and recover funds lost to fraud and abuse in the Medicaid program (Report 10-32, March 2010). Determined that the Agency for Health Care Administration has taken steps to better safeguard Medicaid funds but has not implemented prior recommendations to expand its use of advanced detection methodologies, increase fines on providers that overbill for services, and ensure that managed care plans provide needed services to Medicaid beneficiaries.

Similar Agencies
The federal Government Accountability Office (GAO) is the audit, evaluation, and investigative arm of the United States Congress.

Other states have offices similar to OPPAGA, but the organizational placement of these offices differs among the states.  Nearly half of the offices performing government program evaluation operate as part of a legislative auditor general office.  In another third of the states, including Florida, evaluation offices function as independent legislative units. The remaining states house their evaluation offices within a legislative oversight or another committee (such as the legal drafting and research office).  Similar evaluation and audit organizations are listed below:
Hawaii State Auditor
Maine Office of Program Evaluation and Government Accountability
Minnesota Office of the Legislative Auditor
Mississippi Joint Committee on Performance Evaluation and Expenditure Review
South Carolina Legislative Audit Council
Texas Sunset Advisory Commission
Utah Office of the Legislative Auditor General
Virginia Joint Legislative Audit and Review Commission
Wisconsin Legislative Audit Bureau

State legislative evaluation offices network through the National Legislative Program Evaluation Society to share ideas for improving government operations and identify options for cost savings.

References

External links
Office of Program Policy Analysis and Government Accountability
Florida Legislature
Florida House of Representatives
Florida Senate
National Conference of State Legislatures
National Legislative Program Evaluation Society
Southeastern Evaluation Association

Florida Legislature
Government of Florida